Joseph Moore or Joe Moore may refer to:

Politics and government
Joseph Moore (peace rider) (1732–1793), mediator between US and the Western Confederacy at Sandusky, Ohio in 1793
Joseph Lytle Moore (1826–1871), Irish-born lawyer and political figure in New Brunswick
Joseph B. Moore (Michigan judge) (1845–1930), Michigan Supreme Court justice
J. Hampton Moore (1864–1950), mayor of Philadelphia and U.S. Representative for Pennsylvania
 Joseph Moore (Newfoundland politician) (1869–1946), Newfoundland politician
Joe Moore (politician) (born 1958), Chicago alderman

Entertainment and media
Joe Moore (actor) (1894–1926), Irish-born American actor
Joe Moore (television journalist), television actor and Hawaii news anchor
Joseph Patrick Moore (born 1969), American bassist
Joe Moore (musician) (born 1991), Australian singer-songwriter

Sports
Joe Moore (speed skater) (1901–1982), American Olympic speed skater
Jo-Jo Moore (Joseph Gregg Moore, Sr., 1908–2001), American left fielder in Major League Baseball
Joe Moore (American football coach) (1932–2003), American football coach
Joe Moore (running back) (born 1949), first-round pick of the NFL Chicago Bears in 1971
Joseph Moore (cricketer) (born 1888), Barbadian cricketer

Other
Joseph Haines Moore (1878–1949), American astronomer
Joseph B. Moore (American educator) (born 1950), American educator and academic administrator
Joseph Harold Moore (1914–2006), US Air Force general during the Vietnam War, known for commanding Operation Rolling Thunder
Joseph Moore (medallist) (1817–1892), English medallist
Joseph Moore (priest) (1802–1886), Archdeacon of Man
Joseph Michael John Moore, British World War I flying ace

See also
Joe-Max Moore (born 1971), former American soccer forward